Stictopleurus is a genus of scentless plant bugs belonging to the family Rhopalidae, subfamily Rhopalinae.

Species
 Stictopleurus abutilon (Rossi, 1790)
 Stictopleurus crassicornis (Linnaeus, 1758)
 Stictopleurus intermedius (Baker, 1908)
 Stictopleurus knighti Harris, 1942
 Stictopleurus pictus (Fieber, 1861)
 Stictopleurus plutonius (Baker, 1908)
 Stictopleurus punctatonervosus (Goeze, 1778)
 Stictopleurus punctiventris (Dallas, 1852)
 Stictopleurus ribauti Vidal, 1952
 Stictopleurus ribesi Göllner-Scheiding, 1975
 Stictopleurus sericeus (Horváth, 1896)
 Stictopleurus subtomentosus (Rey, 1888)
 Stictopleurus synavei Göllner-Scheiding, 1975
 Stictopleurus unicolor (Jakovlev, 1873)
 Stictopleurus viridicatus (Uhler, 1872)

References

External links
 Fauna Europaea
 Biolib

Hemiptera of Europe
Articles containing video clips
Rhopalini
Pentatomomorpha genera